Pteropurpura trialata, the three-winged murex, is a medium-sized species of predatory sea snail, a marine gastropod mollusk in the family Muricidae, the rock snails or murex snails. It is native to the eastern Pacific Ocean.

Description
It is fusiform and fairly thick, with a spire angle of 40-42°. The protoconch has one and a half smooth, conical whorls, while the teleoconch has eight whorls which are moderately convex. Each whorl has three elaborately sculptured varices (thickened protruding ridges) with nine to twelve fluted cords extending onto the varices.

Distribution
The three-winged murex occurs in the semi-tropical eastern Pacific Ocean, its range extending from northern California, through Baja California to Mexico.

References

External links 

Muricidae
Gastropods described in 1834